Phantom of the Range is a 1928 American silent Western film directed by James Dugan and starring Tom Tyler, Frankie Darro and Duane Thompson. In 1931 it was remade as a sound film The Cheyenne Cyclone. Tyler also starred in a later film with a similar title The Phantom of the Range.

Cast
 Tom Tyler as Duke Carlton 
 Frankie Darro as Spuds O'Brien 
 Duane Thompson as Patsy O'Brien 
 Charles McHugh as Tim O'Brien 
 James Pierce as 'Flash' Corbin 
 Marjorie Zier as Vera Van Swank

References

Bibliography
 Munden, Kenneth White. The American Film Institute Catalog of Motion Pictures Produced in the United States, Part 1. University of California Press, 1997.

External links
 

1928 films
1928 Western (genre) films
Films directed by James Dugan
American black-and-white films
Film Booking Offices of America films
Silent American Western (genre) films
1920s English-language films
1920s American films